Lisbon and its metropolitan area feature a mild Mediterranean climate (Köppen: Csb/Csa), with short, mild and rainy winters and warm to hot, dry summers. According to the Troll-Paffen climate classification, Lisbon has a warm-temperate subtropical climate (Warmgemäßigt-subtropisches Zonenklima). According to the Siegmund/Frankenberg climate classification, Lisbon has a subtropical climate.

Classifications

Temperature

Normals
Lisbon has mild to warm, moderated temperatures. Summers are warm to hot, but due to the upwelling phenomena in the western coasts of its metropolitan area, maxima in summer fluctuates considerably depending on the location. Costa da Caparica is an exception to this rule as it is far less exposed to the cooler ocean currents and is therefore warmer in the summer.

Extremes
Lisbon's location on the westernmost side of continental Europe makes it much less vulnerable to both heatwaves and coldwaves, though outbrakes of the Saharan Air Layer can sometimes push the temperatures above  as it happened as part of the 2018 European heat wave, skies were a shade of white due to the extreme concentrations of airborne dust particles. The third station (Tapada da Ajuda) recorded .

Temperatures beyond these are usually considered irregular and limited to exceptional years. Lisbon is on the USDA hardiness zone 10b.

Precipitation 
Lisbon can be described both as a moist and a dry city depending on the season of the year. Precipitation is most common in Autumn and Winter. Summers in Lisbon tend to be very dry due to the Azores High though exceptions happen and low-pressure areas can come into play bringing much more rainfall than normal but still avoiding a wet summer (>). Foggy mornings are also common in the summer, especially in coastal areas and can bring drizzle which can sometimes be observed early in the day in wet roads and calçadas.

Lisbon has on average 112 precipitation days a year of which around 30% is drizzle (below ). December is the rainiest month of which half the days receive some form of precipitation.

Humidity
In the same way precipitation varies greatly from month to month, the average relative humidity also experiences considerable seasonal changes. Lisbon has very humid winters, averaging 78-80% humidity. The air in the summer is otherwise dry, 60 to 65%, and is particularly variable, often going below 40% during the day and surpassing 70% at night.

Sunshine 
Lisbon is a sunny city, in fact, it is the sunniest capital city in mainland Europe and one of the sunniest overall places in southern Europe, with more than 2,800 yearly sunshine hours despite the relatively high yearly precipitation. Sunshine and precipitation stack up oppositely with the dullest month being also the rainiest (December) which has around 140-150 total hours. Despite July having the most sun hours, August is on average the sunniest month with around 80% chance of direct sunlight hitting the ground.

In the Lisbon area, sunshine hours reach their maximum value in the southwestern Setúbal Peninsula (near Cabo Espichel), and their lowest in the Sintra Mountains and parts of the northwest District.

Daylight 
Due to its southern position in Europe, Lisbon has a rather optimal number of hours of daylight. Winter days are not as short as in the northern part of the continent and summers have at least 9 hours of nighttime. The average duration of daylight in the wintertime is 10.3 hours (for comparison: London or Moscow or Warsaw have about 8 hours).

Wind
Lisbon is generally still, though it can become quite windy in occasional Atlantic storms, accompanied by rain. The average wind speed depends largely on the area. Tapada da Ajuda has almost no sign of wind, other areas such as Gago Coutinho, near the airport, get double that wind speed. The District of Lisbon, especially the west, is one of Portugal's windiest zones.

Sea temperature
As with the rest of Portugal, ocean temperatures are extremely moderate and cool year-round, only varying  between the coldest and warmest month. The coolest months are February and March (around ) while the warmest are from August through October (around ).

Lisbon Metropolitan Area
Temperature and precipitation variation across various sections of the metropolitan area of Lisbon:

Other stations in the city of Lisbon

See also 
Climate in other places in Iberian Peninsula:
 Climate of Porto
 Climate of Portugal
 Climate of Barcelona
 Climate of Valencia
 Climate of Madrid
 Climate of Bilbao

References 

Geography of Lisbon
Lisbon
Lisbon
Lisbon